The Standard Building, (originally the Brotherhood of Locomotive Engineers Cooperative National Bank Building and later the Standard Bank Building), is a high-rise apartment building located at the southwest corner of Ontario Street and St. Clair Avenue in downtown Cleveland, Ohio. Its north and east facades are clad in cream-colored terra cotta with a recurring starburst motif. The south face, which can be seen from Public Square, is unadorned and windowless. It was designed by Knox and Elliot architects, and was built for $7 million. It was built by the Brotherhood of Locomotive Engineers and Trainmen who owned the building until 2014, when it was sold to Weston, Inc.

History
During the Great Depression, Standard Bank ran into financial difficulties and was sold by the BLE. It merged with two other Cleveland banks in 1930, forming Standard Trust Bank. This bank subsequently failed in 1931 and its assets were liquidated. From World War II until July, 1967, the bank lobby served as an induction station (after 1965, known as an Armed Forces Examining and Entrance Station) for the U.S. military. In the 1940s the building housed Cleveland College, a downtown campus of Western Reserve University, and was the last building of that campus.

To the east, across Ontario Street, is the Marriott at Key Center, built on the site of the landmark Engineers Building, which the BLE sold in 1988 for development, moving into the Standard Building. To the north, across St. Clair Avenue, is the Cuyahoga County Justice Center. The Old Stone Church abuts its south side.

Currently it is the 21st highest building in Cleveland. It was designated a Cleveland Landmark in 1979. In 2007, the boundary of the Euclid Avenue Historic District was increased to include the building, among other structures. In 2014, it was purchased by Weston, Inc. for $3.9 million, and was converted into an apartment building.

See also
List of tallest buildings in Cleveland

References

External links

The Standard Building

Apartment buildings in Cleveland
Skyscraper office buildings in Cleveland
Office buildings completed in 1925
Downtown Cleveland
Brotherhood of Locomotive Engineers and Trainmen